Plesiodema is a genus of true bugs belonging to the family Miridae.

The species of this genus are found in Europe and Northern America.

Species:
 Plesiodema abiesicolus (Schwartz & Schuh, 1999) 
 Plesiodema gotohi Yasunaga, 2003

References

Miridae
Hemiptera genera